The Holy Defense Year Book Award is an international literary award presented yearly since 1993.

This is an award presented by the Government of Iran to authors, poets and researchers in recognition of distinguished merit in the fields of Resistance Literature.

Winners
8th award 
 Narges Abyar, Mountain on the shoulders tree 
 Morteza Avini, Heavenly Treasures 

9th award
 Masoumeh Ramhormozi, Eternal Fragrance

13th award
 Saeed 'Akif, Fill vacancies
 Akbar Sahraei, Boxwood and wish IV 
 Ahmad Dehqan, Dashtban

16th award (2014)
 Behnaz Zarabi Zadeh, Daughter Of Sheena
 Masoumeh Abad, I'm Alive
 Ahmad Dehqan, Blog
17th award (2018)

18th award (2019)

See also

 List of history awards

References

External links
 Over 2000 works competing in 16th Sacred Defense Book Award 
  Mehr News Agency:اولین جایزه ادبی سعدی به یک ایرانشناس داغستانی رسید 

Iranian literary awards
Awards established in 1993
Fiction awards
History awards